The Pearce-Wheeler Farm, near Canmer in Hart County, Kentucky, was listed on the National Register of Historic Places in 2005. The listing included four contributing buildings and a contributing site.

It includes a main house (c.1847), a smokehouse (c.1847), a livestock barn (c.1847), a large mule barn (c.1903), and a "small building, now in ruins, said to have once been a slave house. The former slave house originally was located just behind the main house, then moved closer to the barns and converted to use as a harness shop during the Wheeler ownership."

References

National Register of Historic Places in Hart County, Kentucky
Buildings and structures completed in 1847